WHCD may refer to:

 White House Correspondents' Dinner, an annual event put on by the White House Correspondents' Association
 WSYR-FM (previously WHCD), a news/talk radio station serving Syracuse and central New York